The seventh season of Degrassi: The Next Generation commenced airing in Canada on 14 January 2008, concluded on 23 June 2008, and consists of twenty-four episodes. Degrassi: The Next Generation is a Canadian serial teen drama television series. This season takes place during the winter/spring semester of the school year that began in season six and continues to depict the lives of a group of high school sophomores, juniors, seniors and graduates as they deal with some of the challenges and issues young adults face, such as rape, school violence, cancer, drug use, prostitution, sexual misconduct, racism, sexism, parenthood, HIV and relationships. 

Season seven aired Mondays at 7:30 p.m. (7:00 p.m. in Quebec) on CTV, a Canadian terrestrial television network. In the United States, it premiered on the Noggin cable channel during its programming block for teenagers, The N. Season seven debuted in the US three months before it began broadcasting in Canada, on 5 October 2007. In total, sixteen episodes aired in the US before they did Canada. Further to being broadcast on television, episodes were made available for free streaming on CTV's website; the season is also available on US and Canadian iTunes. The second Degrassi dedicated soundtrack, Music from Degrassi: The Next Generation, was released 9 December 2008.

Production took place in Toronto, Ontario between April and December 2007. In addition to the twenty-four regular episodes, two "special episodes" were produced, not part of the Degrassi continuity. The first, "Degrassi in Kenya" depicted the cast members travelling to Africa to assist the building of a school. It aired 18 October 2007 on MTV Canada, and 14 March 2008 on The N. The second, "Degrassi of the Dead", was a Halloween special, and featured the characters being turned into zombies. It aired on 26 October 2007 on The N, and four days later on CTV. In the U.S. "Bust A Move Part 1 and 2" were combined to form "Degrassi Spring Break Movie". 

Viewing figures for season seven were not as high as previous seasons; by the twelfth episode, figures were down to 314,000 viewers, a 46% decrease from the season premiere which was watched by 585,000 viewers. Despite the decrease in viewers, however, reviews for the season were of praise, rather than criticism.

Cast

Main cast
 Miriam McDonald as Emma Nelson (18 episodes)
 Cassie Steele as Manuela "Manny" Santos (17 episodes)
 Shane Kippel as Gavin "Spinner" Mason (14 episodes)
 Melissa DiMarco as Daphne Hatzilakos (14 episodes)
 Aubrey Graham as Jimmy Brooks (13 episodes)
 Dalmar Abuzeid as Danny Van Zandt (13 episodes)
 Shenae Grimes as Darcy Edwards (12 episodes)
 Stefan Brogren as Archie "Snake" Simpson (12 episodes)
 Sarah Barrable-Tishauer as Liberty Van Zandt (12 episodes)
 Jamie Johnston as Peter Stone (12 episodes)
 Charlotte Arnold as Holly J. Sinclair (11 episodes)
 Paula Brancati as Jane Vaughn (11 episodes)
 Marc Donato as Derek Haig (11 episodes)
 Mike Lobel as Jay Hogart (10 episodes)
 Stacey Farber as Ellie Nash (9 episodes)
 Adamo Ruggiero as Marco Del Rossi (9 episodes)
 Jake Goldsbie as Toby Isaacs (9 episodes)
 Mike Lobel as Jay Hogart (8 episodes)
 Lauren Collins as Paige Michalchuk (7 episodes)
 Mazin Elsadig as Damian Hayes (7 episodes)
 Nina Dobrev as Mia Jones (6 episodes)
 Melissa McIntyre as Ashley Kerwin (6 episodes)
 Amanda Stepto as Christine "Spike" Nelson (4 episodes)

Recurring cast
 Scott Paterson as Johnny DiMarco (12 episodes)
 Samantha Munro as Anya MacPherson (10 episodes)
 Natty Zavitz as Bruce the Moose (9 episodes)
 Raymond Ablack as Savtaj "Sav" Bhandari (8 episodes)
 Nathan Stephenson as Griffin Pierce-Taylor (8 episodes)
 Marc Minardi as Lucas Valieri (8 episodes)
 Doug Morency as Mr. Bince (7 episodes)
 Marcus Wright as Noah Edwards (7 episodes)
 Von Flores as Mr. Joseph Santos (6 episodes)
 Ruth Marshall as Helen Edwards (5 episodes)
 Dwain Murphy as Eric (5 episodes)
 Ted Atherton as Randall Edwards (4 episodes)
 Steve Belford as Jesse Stefanovic (4 episodes)
 Linlyn Lue as Ms. Laura Kwan (4 episodes)
 Terra Vnesa as Trina (4 episodes)
 Marie V. Cruz as Mrs. Julietta Santos (4 episodes)
 Tom Melissis as Mr. Dom Perino (4 episodes)
 Natalie Lisinska as Andrea (3 episodes)
 Larissa Vouloukos as Isabella Jones (3 episodes)
 Michael Kinney as Coach Darryl Armstrong (3 episodes)
 Aislinn Paul as Clare Edwards (2 episodes)
 Noah S. Wallach as Student (2 episodes)
 Deanna Casaluce as Alex Nuñez (2 episodes)
 Jennifer Podemski as Ms. Chantel Sauvé (2 episodes)
 Jajube Mandiela as Chantay Black (2 episodes)
 Robin Craig as Mrs. Mason (2 episodes)
 Kate Todd as Natasha (2 episodes)
 Joe Pingue as Tony (2 episodes)
 Leanne Poirier Greenfield as Spirit Bear (2 episodes)
 Darren Hynes as Linc (2 episodes)
 Rebecca Amare as Sorority Girl (2 episodes)
 Chad Connell as Ben (2 episodes)
 Julian Tassielli as Officer (2 episodes)
 Gina Clayton as Anna Jones (2 episodes)

Guest Stars
 Caroline Park as Kim (1 episode)
 Laurie Murdoch as Dr. Rotman (1 episode)
 Anthony Berlingeri as himself - Model (1 episode)
 Ayumi Iizuka as Ms. Lee (1 episode)
 Chantal Craig as Check-up Doctor (1 episode)
 Stephanie Morgenstern as Doc Rota (1 episode)
 Calvin Jung as Cancer Doctor (1 episode)
 Leanna Tallmeister as Degrassi Student in Fight (1 episode)
 Denis Akiyama as Oncologist (1 episode)
 Nicco Lorenzo Garcia as Jubert (1 episode)
 Steve Comilang as Uncle Eduardo (1 episode)
 Stacie Mistysyn as Caitlin Ryan (1 episode)
 Sian Richards as Kym (1 episode)
 James Gilbert as PR Guy (1 episode)
 Adam Kennedy as PA (1 episode)
 Lara Fenton as Jenny (1 episode)
 Alex Woods as David (1 episode)
 Paul McQuillan as Tobias (1 episode)
 Benjamin Hollingsworth as Devon (1 episode)
 Rebecca Applebaum as Cashier (1 episode)
 Jordan Gatto as Cute Blonde Guy (1 episode)
 Christopher Lee Clements as Bouncer (1 episode)
 Ashley Wright as Politician (1 episode)
 Jake McDowell as Guy (1 episode)
 Ramona Pringle as Roadside Girl (1 episode)
 Shirley Douglas as Professor Dunwoody (1 episode)
 Jake Epstein as Craig Manning (1 episode)
 Hailee Sisera as Rachel (1 episode)
 Naomi Snieckus as Store Manager (1 episode)
 Linda Prystawska as Monica (1 episode)
 Jacob Kraemer as Tyler (1 episode)
 James Arnold as Yuppie Dad (1 episode)
 Heidi Weeks as Yuppie Mom (1 episode)
 Robert Bidaman as Jay's Dad (1 episode)
 Kim Bourne as Carolyn (1 episode)
 Tyler Bruce as Ethan (1 episode)
 Quincy Bullen as Grade Niner (1 episode)
 Kay Valley as Nurse (1 episode)
 Conrad Coates as Mr. Jemaine Brooks (1 episode)
 Sharon Lewis as Jimmy's Mother (1 episode)
 Marcel Jones as Marcus (1 episode)
 Kathy Maloney as Melanie (1 episode)
 Craig Kielburger as himself (1 episode)
 Jeffrey Knight as Auctioneer (1 episode)
 Daniel Clark as Sean Cameron (1 episode)
 Angela Asher as Evelyn Valieri (1 episode)
 Kerry Griffin as Greg (1 episode)
 Liz Best as Female Cop (1 episode)
 Robert Gow as Male Cop (1 episode)
 Linda V. Carter as Caseworker (1 episode)
 Ryder Britton as Hugh (1 episode)
 Lori Alter as Producer (1 episode)
 Tommy Lioutas as Brad West (1 episode)
 Hal Eisen as Wardrobe Guy (1 episode)
 Fraser Young as Lederhösers (1 episode)
 Arlene Duncan as Mrs. Van Zandt (1 episode)
 Roy Lewis as Mr. Harold Van Zandt (1 episode)
 Natasha Bedingfield as herself (1 episode)
 Paul Miller as Mr. Stone (1 episode)
 Ursula Campbell as Missy (1 episode)

Crew
The season was produced by Epitome Pictures in association with CTV. Funding was provided by The Canadian Film or Video Production Tax Credit and the Ontario Film and Television Tax Credit, the Canadian Television Fund and BCE-CTV Benefits, The Shaw Television Broadcast Fund, the Independent Production Fund, Mountain Cable Program, and RBC Royal Bank.

Linda Schuyler, co-creator of the Degrassi franchise and CEO of Epitome Pictures, was an executive producer of season seven, as were Stephen Stohn (Epitome Pictures' president) and Brendon Yorke. David Lowe served as producer, and Stefan Brogren as co-creative producer. In several episodes James Hurst was credited as executive creative consultant. Vera Santamaria was executive story editor, with Duana Taha serving as story editor. The editor was Stephen Withrow, Stephen Stanley the production designer, and the cinematographers were Gavin Smith and John Berrie.

The writers for season seven are Emily Andras, Nicole Demerse, Brian Hartigan, Matt Huether, James Hurst, Aaron Martin, Kate Miles Melville, Vera Santamaria, Sara Snow, Duana Taha, and Brendon Yorke.

Directors of the episodes include Phil Earnshaw, Sturla Gunnarsson, Eleanore Lindo, Graeme Lynch, Bruce McDonald, Stefan Scaini, Gilbert Shilton, and Pat Williams.

Reception
Viewing figures of the seventh season of Degrassi: The Next Generation did not fare as well as previous seasons. The first twelve episodes averaged only 455,000 viewers, compared to the same number of episodes in season six, which averaged 500,000 viewers. The season premiere achieved the highest figures with 585,000 viewers. This progressively dropped over the forthcoming weeks from 446,000 viewers on 28 January 2008, to 407,000 viewers on 11 February 2008, and continued to fall to 314,000 viewers over forthcoming weeks.

Despite the poor ratings, the mass media still reacted positively to the season. Joel Rubinoff of the Waterloo Region Record praised the show for "remaining consistent ... [in] its ability to shock and surprise in a way that never lets us [the viewers] down ... Shenae Grimes, whose complex portrayal of a young woman in mental pain—and the conflicting emotions that entails—makes her depiction not only believable, but to those who have had similar experiences, entirely relatable." Raju Mudhar of the Toronto Star also had praise for the season, commenting that "the way that it has managed to deal with aging—which has been the destruction for many of its peers, and the level of honesty and attempted authenticity has always set Degrassi apart. The fact that show has always cast actors within a year or two of their characters' ages has always helped." AfterElton.com, a website which focuses on the portrayal of homosexual and bisexual men in the media, and owned by MTV Networks' Logo cable television network, named the character Marco del Rossi as one of their "Top 25 Gay TV Characters".

Season seven also won awards for its gay-oriented storylines; it was nominated for a GLAAD Media Award in the Best Drama Series category, alongside Dirty Sexy Money, Greek, The L Word and the winner, Brothers & Sisters. In the US, The N was presented with The Trevor Commitment Award by The Trevor Project for breaking new ground in the positive representation of gay and questioning youth. The season was also nominated for a Teen Choice Award in the Choice TV: Comedy category, but lost to Hannah Montana. In the 2008 Directors Guild of Canada Awards, which were held on 8 November, "Standing in the Dark" Part Two was nominated in the Television Series Sound Editing category. "Pass the Dutchie", directed by Patrick Williams, won the award for best direction in the Team Television Series – Family category. In the 2008 Gemini Awards the season picked up four nominations. The series won the award for Best Children's or Youth Fiction Program or Series; Shane Kippel and Lauren Collins were vying for the award for "Best Performance in a Children's or Youth Program or Series" for their performances in the episodes "Death or Glory Part Two" and "Talking in Your Sleep", respectively, but ultimately lost to Alexz Johnson from Epitome Pictures' Instant Star; and Phil Earnshaw was nominated for Best Direction in a Children's or Youth Program or Series for "Standing in the Dark Part One".

It was also during this season that Degrassi won a 2008 TV.com award for best teen clique; Hannah Montana, Greek and Gossip Girl were among the other nominees included in this category.

Episodes
Season seven premiered during Noggin's teen-oriented block, "The N," three months before its CTV debut; Canadian viewers had to wait until the thirteenth episode to watch an episode before American viewers. The N broadcast the season in three separate waves, airing the first seven episodes from 5 October to 16 November 2007, before putting the show on hiatus. On 31 December 2007, The N was spun off from Noggin into its own separate channel, and the second wave of episodes aired on the new network from 8 February 2008 to 9 May, before returning once again on 11 July for the remaining six episodes. In Canada, the season premiere aired 14 January 2008 and aired a new episode each week until the season finale on 23 June.

The N aired Bust a Move Part 1 & 2 together as The Degrassi Spring Break Movie. The N aired episode 718, "Another Brick in the Wall" before 717, "Talking in Your Sleep", and 721, "Everything She Wants" before 720, "Ladies Night". CTV held back episode 703, "Love is a Battlefield," and broadcast it after episode 719, "Broken Wings".

This list is by order of production, as they appear on the DVD.

DVD release
The DVD release of season seven was released online and in select stores by Echo Bridge Home Entertainment in the US on 17 March 2009, this is the first season not to be released by Alliance Atlantis Home Entertainment in Canada, or by FUNimation Entertainment in the US. As well as every episode from the season, the DVD release features bonus material including deleted scenes, bloopers and behind-the-scenes featurettes.

References

External links
Season 7 episode synopses at CTV Television Network
 List of Degrassi: The Next Generation episodes at IMDB.

Degrassi: The Next Generation seasons
2008 Canadian television seasons